Sheldon William Galbraith,  (May 24, 1922 – April 14, 2015) was a Canadian figure skating coach whose students have won all three categories at World Championships (men's, ladies' and pairs'). His students also won Canada's first Olympic gold medals in the ladies' and pairs' competitions.

History

Born in Sturgeon Creek, Manitoba, the youngest of four children of William James Boyd and Mabel Agnes Frederika Mabel, he moved with his family to Tacoma, Washington in 1928. In 1943, he married Jeanne Schulte.

His students have included Barbara Ann Scott, Frances Dafoe, Norris Bowden, Barbara Wagner, Gary Beacom, Robert Paul, Donald Jackson and Vern Taylor. He was the Winter Olympics Canadian team coach in 1948, 1956 and 1960.

He was a founder of the Professional Skaters' Association of Canada and was its first president.

In 1980, he was inducted into Canada's Sports Hall of Fame. In 1991, he was inducted into the Canadian Figure Skating Hall of Fame. In 1996, he was inducted into the World Figure Skating Museum and Hall of Fame, and in 2003 the Professional Skaters Association Coaches Hall of Fame. In 1999, he was made a Member of the Order of Canada. In 2005, he was awarded the Order of Ontario. He died on April 14, 2015.

References

External links
 Sheldon Galbraith biography
 Order of Canada Citation

1922 births
2015 deaths
Canadian expatriates in the United States
Canadian sports coaches
Canadian figure skating coaches
Members of the Order of Canada
Members of the Order of Ontario
Sportspeople from Manitoba
Sportspeople from Tacoma, Washington
Skating people from Ontario